Alexandra Depledge  is a British technology entrepreneur, known best for being the founder and CEO of Resi, and as the founder and former CEO of Helpling, formerly known as Hassle.com. In 2016 she was awarded an MBE for services to the sharing economy.

Early life and education 
Alex Depledge was born in Bradford, West Yorkshire. She graduated from the University of Nottingham with a History and American Studies degree in 2003, then moved to the US and obtained a master's degree in International Relations at the University of Chicago.

Career 
In 2005, Depledge returned to the UK and started her career in 2006 as a consultant for Accenture in the UK, she finally left Accenture in 2012 to start her own venture.

Hassle.com 
In 2012, Depledge and Jules Coleman co-founded Hassle.com, a London-based online platform for domestic cleaners. The business raised $6 million from Venture firm, Accel Partners, the first backers of Facebook & Spotify to scale across Europe. The company was acquired by a German company, Helpling, in 2015.

Resi 
In 2017, Depledge and Coleman started a new venture, Resi "formerly known as BuildPath", an online architectural platform helping UK homeowners renovate and extend their homes.

Depledge was also the chair and director of The Coalition for a Digital Economy (Coadec) in the period from 2015 to 2017 founder of the government-backed Sharing Economy UK trade body, SEUK. Depledge currently sits on the board of the London Economic Action Partnership (LEAP) chaired by the Mayor of London. She is a regular TV & radio commentator and co-presented BBC3 program “Girls Can Code” part of its Thinking Digital season 2015.

Awards and honours 
Depledge was appointed Member of the Order of the British Empire (MBE) in the 2016 Birthday Honours for services to the economy and has been recognised with a number of awards for her work as an entrepreneur:

 Computer Weekly – The 50 Most Influential Women in UK Tech 2017.
 Debrett's 500 - Most influential People List 2016 & 2017.
 FDM Everywoman in Technology Awards - Startup Founder of The Year 2015.
 Management Today - 35 Under 35 List 2015.

References 

Year of birth missing (living people)
Living people
British technology company founders
21st-century English businesswomen
Businesspeople from Bradford
Members of the Order of the British Empire
21st-century English businesspeople